Karl Anthony Farmer (born August 28, 1954) is a former American football wide receiver who played three seasons in the National Football League with the Atlanta Falcons and Tampa Bay Buccaneers. He was drafted by the Atlanta Falcons in the seventh round of the 1976 NFL Draft. He first enrolled at Los Angeles Southwest College before transferring to the University of Pittsburgh. Farmer attended George Washington Preparatory High School in Westmont, California.

References

External links
Just Sports Stats
College stats

Living people
1954 births
Players of American football from Oklahoma
American football wide receivers
African-American players of American football
Pittsburgh Panthers football players
Atlanta Falcons players
Tampa Bay Buccaneers players
Sportspeople from Oklahoma City
21st-century African-American people
20th-century African-American sportspeople